Otto Hittmair (1924–2003) was an Austrian theoretical physicist who made contributions to quantum mechanics, superconductivity and unified field theory. From 1987 to 1991 he was President of the Austrian Academy of Sciences.

Life 
Otto Hittmair was born in Innsbruck (Tyrol) on March 16, 1924.  He graduated with distinction from the University of Innsbruck in 1942.  He worked with Erwin Schrödinger at the Dublin Institute for Advanced Studies in the late 1940s and together with him, published work on a unified field theory. 
He worked abroad at the Institut Henri Poincaré, the University of Sydney, and the Massachusetts Institute of Technology (MIT) in Cambridge where he was a Fulbright scholar.

His specialty was nuclear reactions, especially stripping reactions, in which nucleons are exchanged between the scattering nuclei.  In 1958-1960 he worked at the Atomic Institute of the Austrian Universities and in 1960 became Professor of Theoretical Physics and Director of the Institute of Theoretical Physics at the Technical University of Vienna.

He was Dean of the Faculty of Science from 1968 to 1969 and then Rector of the Technical University of Vienna from 1977 to 1979.

Otto Hittmair died on September 5, 2003 in a climbing accident in the Nordkette mountain range near Innsbruck.  The main-belt asteroid 10782 Hittmair discovered in 1991 is named after him. Otto-Hittmair-Platz in Innsbruck is named in his honor.

Works
 1951 Studies in the generalized theory of gravitation (with Erwin Schrödinger),  Dublin Institute for Advanced Studies
 1957 Nuclear Stripping Reactions (with S. T. Buttler and Stuart Thomas), Horwitz Publications
 1971 Wärmetheorie (with G. Adam), Vieweg+Teubner Verlag,    
 1972 Lehrbuch der Quantentheorie,  Verlag Karl Thiemig, January 1, 1972, 
 1979 Supraleitung (mit H. Weber), K. Thiemig, 
 1987 Schrödinger's unified field theory seen 40 years later'''' (Editor C. W. Kilmister), Technische Universitӓt Wien
 1997 Akademie der Wissenschaften : Entwicklung einer österreichischen Forschungsinstitution'' (with Herbert Hunger), Verlag der Österreichischen, Vienna,

References

Austrian nuclear physicists
Scientists from Innsbruck
Academic staff of TU Wien
1924 births
2003 deaths
Members of the Austrian Academy of Sciences
Academics of the Dublin Institute for Advanced Studies